Devotion (Italian title L'edera) is a 1950 Italian melodrama film directed by Augusto Genina.

The film is adapted from the famous Italian novel L'Edera written by Grazia Deledda and published in 1908.

Synopsis
Annesa (played by Columba Dominguez), is a from a declining aristocratic family and very much devoted to her family, the Decherchi, which is at the edge of financial collapse. The fate of the family depends on the success of their efforts to inherit the estate of a distant uncle who, is hosted by the Decherchis, because of his ill health and is now on the verge of dying. Annesa, exacerbated by the refusal of the uncle to help financially Annesa's financially strapped nephew Don Paulu Decherchi (played by Roldano Lupi), that she is secretly in love with, murders the uncle. Despite the suspicions and investigations by the police, the murder is not discovered. But Annesa, overcome by remorse, confesses her deed to a priest.

Cast
 Columba Domínguez: Annesa
 Roldano Lupi: Don Paulu Decherchi
 Juan de Landa: Virdis, il sacerdote
 Franca Marzi: Zana
 Emma Baron: Donna Francesca
 Nino Pavese: Salvatore Spanu
 Gualtiero Tumiati: Zio Zua

External links
 

1950 films
1950s Italian-language films
Films based on Italian novels
Films shot in Sardinia
Films directed by Augusto Genina
Films based on works by Grazia Deledda
Films set in Sardinia
Italian drama films
1950 drama films
Melodrama films
1950s Italian films